Abaza Pasha may refer to:

Abaza Mehmed Pasha (1576-1634), Ottoman statesman and military commander
Abaza Hasan Pasha (died 1659)
Abaza Muhammad Pasha (died 1771), commandant of Yeni-Kale
Abaza Siyavuş Pasha I (died 1656), Grand Vizier of the Ottoman Empire
Abaza Siyavuş Pasha (died 1688), Grand Vizier of the Ottoman Empire
Fekry Pasha Abaza (1896–1979), Egyptian journalist and democratic political activist

See also
Abaza family
Abbas Pasha (disambiguation)
Pasha